Valladolid Airport  is an airport situated in the municipality of Villanubla, ten kilometres northwest of Valladolid (Castile and León, Spain). The civilian airport shares space with an air base of the Spanish Air and Space Force called "Base Aérea de Villanubla" (Villanubla Air Base).

Overview 
The airport was opened in 1938 in Villanubla, a small town 11 km from Valladolid. It has been renovated in 1952, 1972, 1982, 1990 and 2000. The new passenger terminal was inaugurated in 2000, and its main features are its clean, functional design, emphasised by spaciousness and numerous aesthetically pleasing elements. During recent years, with the arrival of low-cost airline companies, passenger numbers have increased greatly, particularly in the area of tourist and holiday flights. The terminal offers all the usual amenities expected by passengers, including a duty-free shop, café and restaurant, ATM and information services.

Airlines and destinations 
The following airlines operate regular scheduled and charter flights at Valladolid Airport:

Statistics 

Passenger numbers and aircraft movements since 2000:

See also

 Valladolid
 Province of Valladolid
 List of airports in Spain

References

External links

Valladolid Airport website

Airports in Castile and León
Province of Valladolid
Airports established in 1938